Antony and the Johnsons is the debut album by Antony and the Johnsons, recorded in 1998 and released officially in 2000.

Release
Originally, the album was released in 2000 on David Tibet's label Durtro. Antony and the Johnsons was reissued by Secretly Canadian in 2004.

Track listing

Personnel
Main personnel
 Anohni – voice, piano
 François Gehin – bass
 Vicky Leavitt – cello
 William Basinski – clarinet
 Barb Morrison – clarinet, saxophone
 Tahrah Cohen – drums
 Mariana Davenport – flute
 Charles Neiland – guitar (effects)
 Baby Dee – harp
 Cady Finlayson – violin
 Liz Maranville – violin

Additional personnel
 Alan Douches – engineering
 Erika Larsen – engineering
 Rich Lamb – engineering
 Roger Fife – engineering
 Steve Regina – engineering
 Denis Blackham – mastering
 Hahn Rowe – mixing (1–6, 8, 9)

External links
Secretly Canadian press release

Antony and the Johnsons albums
Durtro albums
2000 debut albums